Bythinella intermedia (formerly known as Bythinella austriaca austriaca) is a recently extinct species of very small freshwater snail, an aquatic gastropod mollusk in the family Amnicolidae.

This species used to be endemic to Austria. The IUCN listed it as extinct in 2006.

References 

 IUCN Redlist

Bythinella
Extinct gastropods
Endemic fauna of Austria
Gastropods described in 1843